The Canadian Journal of Earth Sciences is a monthly peer-reviewed scientific journal established in 1963, which reports current research on all aspects of the Earth sciences. It is published by NRC Research Press. The journal also publishes special issues that focus on information and studies limited in scope to a specific segment of the Earth sciences. The editor-in-chief is Dr. Brendan Murphy (St. Francis Xavier University) and Sally Pehrsson (University of Saskatchewan). According to the Journal Citation Reports, the journal has a 2020 impact factor of 1.369.

References

External links
 

Earth and atmospheric sciences journals
Monthly journals
Publications established in 1963
Canadian Science Publishing academic journals
Multilingual journals